Universal Religion Chapter 6 is the sixth compilation album in the Universal Religion compilation series mixed and compiled by Dutch DJ and record producer Armin van Buuren. It was released on 14 September 2012 by Armada Music.

Track listing

References

External links
 at Armada Music

Armin van Buuren compilation albums
Electronic compilation albums
2012 compilation albums